Gender, Work & Organization is a bimonthly peer-reviewed academic journal. The journal was established in 1994 and is published by John Wiley & Sons. It covers research on the role of gender on the workfloor. The editors-in-chief are Alison Pullen (Macquarie University), Patricia Lewis (University of Kent), and Banu Ozkazanc-Pan (Brown University). In addition to the regular issues, the journal publishes several special issues per year and has new section, Feminist Frontiers, dedicated to contemporary conversations and topics in feminism.

Abstracting and indexing 
The journal is abstracted and indexed in:

According to the Journal Citation Reports, the journal has a 2019 impact factor of 3.101, ranking it 1/45 of journals in the category "Women's Studies" and 83/226 of journal in the category "Management".

See also 
 List of women's studies journals

References

External links 
 

Bimonthly journals
English-language journals
Gender studies journals
Publications established in 1994
Wiley-Blackwell academic journals
Women's health
Women's studies journals